The Pernambuco gubernatorial election was held on October 3, 2010 to elect the next governor of Pernambuco.  The PSB's Eduardo Campos won reelection in a landslide.

References

October 2010 events in South America
Pernambuco gubernatorial elections
2010 Brazilian gubernatorial elections